Anita Altman (born June 2, 1945) is an American social entrepreneur and city planner. She is the co-founder of ReelAbilities, America's largest film festival screening films by, or about, people with disabilities. Altman is an active Jewish feminist, and a member of New York's B’Nai Jeshrun synagogue. She is the mother of Sascha Altman DuBrul, co-founder of the Icarus Project.

Early life and education

Altman was raised in a working-class Greek Jewish community in East Bronx. Her Romaniote Jewish grandparents, Anna and Zadick Coffino, emigrated from the Ottoman Empire to the Lower East Side of Manhattan, before settling in Hunts Point
Her father, Jack Altman who was an Ashkenazi Jewish plumber, married their daughter Sarah.

Altman attended the all-girls Hunter College High School. She received a B.A. in Political Science from The City College of New York in 1967, and a Master of Professional Studies in Health Services Administration from the New School for Social Research in 1982. In 2014, Altman was awarded the City Colleges' Alumni Association's Townsend Harris medal for outstanding post-graduate achievement.

Altman has one older brother, Stanley Altman, who is a professor at Baruch College.

Career

While working at New York City's Planning Department, Altman participated in developing the Master Plan for the city. 

While working in New York's Health Services Administration, she focused on improving prison health services. 

Altman worked as the Director of Community Development for Co-op City, organizing human service providers and an array of cultural programs. 

As Deputy Director of Montefiore Medical Center's Building Program, Altman worked with hospital administrators, architects, the City Planning Commission, and community representatives to help plan the reconstruction and expansion of its physical plant. 

Altman served on Manhattan's Community Board 7 for ten years from 1973 to 1983 and was the co-chair of its Social and Health Care Services sub-committee for several of those years.

AIDS/HIV and NORCs 
In 1987, Altman began working at the UJA-Federation and spearheaded the first grant proposal to fund “A Jewish Response to the AIDS Epidemic,” which helped establish training and educational programs and create service programs linking hospitals and community-based agencies. UJA-Federation became one of the five founding members of the New York AIDS Coalition, which emerged as the largest AIDS advocacy organization in New York State.

Altman worked to raise support for Naturally Occurring Retirement Communities (NORCs) as environments to organize communities with substantial senior populations. Altman believed an increasing number of seniors must be enabled “to age in place.”  Altman helped execute the program concepts pioneered at Penn South, a union-sponsored, moderate-income housing co-op in Manhattan's Chelsea community, including a program with the express goal of helping senior residents to remain living in their own home. This supportive service program (SSP), mobilized the community and built partnerships between senior residents, housing management, and health and social service agencies to achieve that end. With the support of the Robert Wood Foundation, the program was successfully replicated and in 1994 the New York State Legislature passed the first NORC-SSP legislation in the country, providing matching grants to an original 10 programs. This was followed in 1999 by the establishment of the New York City NORC funded by its City Council.

In 1993, Altman convened a group of authorities in related fields to address the question of domestic violence in the Jewish community. This resulted in her founding the UJA-Federation Task Force on Family Violence, which, in 2001, received the New York State Governor's COURAGE award. In 2008, Altman received the Woman of Valor award from the New York Board of Rabbis for her work with the Task Force.

Altman also founded the UJA-Federation Task Force on People with Disabilities, which focused on serving disabled people and their families throughout the New York metro area.

ReelAbilities Film Festival 
During her work with the UJA Task Force on People with Disabilities, Altman decided that films could be an effective medium to help create wider public awareness about people with disabilities. In partnership with the Jewish Community Center in Manhattan, she founded ReelAbilities: New York Disabilities Film Festival.

ReelAbilities is now the largest film festival in the country dedicated to promoting awareness and appreciation of people with different disabilities, with 13 cities currently sponsoring festivals in their own communities. Altman herself has said, “It is a festival with a social mission, namely to change public perception and understanding of who are people with disabilities.”

References

Living people
1945 births
Jewish feminists
American disability rights activists
People from the Bronx
American urban planners
Social entrepreneurs
City College of New York alumni
Hunter College High School alumni